Durham Township is one of twenty-four townships in Hancock County, Illinois, USA.  As of the 2010 census, its population was 278 and it contained 129 housing units.

Geography

Unincorporated towns
 Durham at 
(This list is based on USGS data and may include former settlements.)

Cemeteries
The township contains these five cemeteries: Byler, Durham, Gittings, Gittings Mound and Vandruff.

Major highways
  Illinois Route 9
  Illinois Route 94

Airports and landing strips
 Douglas Airport

Demographics

School districts
 Nauvoo-Colusa Community Unit School District 325
 Illini West (Carthage, LaHarpe, and Dallas City)

Political districts
 Illinois's 18th congressional district
 State House District 94
 State Senate District 47

References
 United States Census Bureau 2008 TIGER/Line Shapefiles
 
 United States National Atlas

External links
 City-Data.com
 Illinois State Archives
 Township Officials of Illinois

Townships in Hancock County, Illinois
Townships in Illinois